WEKZ (1260 AM; "Big Country") is a radio station licensed to serve Monroe, Wisconsin, United States.  The station is owned by Scott Thompson and the broadcast license is held by Big Radio. Their studios and transmitter are east of Monroe, at W4765 Radio Lane. WEKZ's programming is simulcast on translator station W238CB (95.5 FM).

Sister stations include WBGR-FM (93.7) licensed to Monroe, WFRL (1570 AM) and WFPS (92.1 FM) licensed to Freeport, Illinois, and WQLF (102.1 FM) licensed to Lena, Illinois.

WEKZ broadcasts a classic country music format, plus extensive local news and sports programming. The station was assigned the WEKZ call sign by the Federal Communications Commission.

Translator

References

External links

EKZ
Classic country radio stations in the United States
Green County, Wisconsin
Radio stations established in 1951
1951 establishments in Wisconsin